Anja Prša (born 9 June 1994) is a Slovenian football defender currently playing in the 1. SŽNL for Olimpija Ljubljana. She made her debut for the senior Slovenian national team in November 2011 against the Netherlands.

References

External links
 

1994 births
Living people
Slovenian women's footballers
Women's association football defenders
Slovenia women's international footballers
Place of birth missing (living people)
ŽNK Mura players
ŽNK Olimpija Ljubljana players